The canton of Bourg-en-Bresse-Est  is a former administrative division in eastern France. It was disbanded following the French canton reorganisation which came into effect in March 2015. It comprised part of the commune of Bourg-en-Bresse. It had 12,276 inhabitants (2012).

Demographics

See also
Cantons of the Ain department 
Communes of France

Notes

Former cantons of Ain
2015 disestablishments in France
States and territories disestablished in 2015